is an action role-playing game developed and published by Namco and released in Japan in 2002. It is the first game in the Klonoa series to combine both standard action-gaming elements with role-playing features.

Story 
Klonoa Heroes is set in an alternate universe from the other games in the series. Here, Klonoa lives in his hometown of Breezegale and is setting his sights on becoming a true hero. Klonoa's dream is to obtain a Hero Medal, a mystical medal that serves as the "sign of a hero". The Hero Medals themselves have different ranks depending on how heroic its holder is, and legend has it that there is a special variant of the Hero Medal that no one has seen yet. The game begins with him and his friend, Chipple, trying to pluck a special flower, the Hikari Sakura (literally the Light Sakura or Light Cherry-blossom) from a tree branch. The flower is said to only bloom under special circumstances, and the person who possesses it will be granted good luck.

After getting the Hikari Sakura, Klonoa was informed by Popka, his small, dog-like friend, that several small monsters have taken up residence around his town, and Klonoa rushes to beat them back. Not long after defeating them, Klonoa decides to visit his childhood friend, a priestess-in-training named Lolo, who informs him that more monsters have been sighted on Bell Hill, located just up the path from the shrine she is studying in.  After promising he will come back safely, Klonoa makes his way to the top of the hill, only to be ambushed by a group of Moos. Just then, he is rescued by a young man on a motorcycle named Guntz. Klonoa notices that Guntz has a bronze Hero Medal, but Guntz brushes him off and ends up taking the flower. After fighting and regaining the flower, Klonoa catches up to give it to Lolo (who he sought to give it to originally) as he wishes her luck on the journey just before she departs from Breezegale. Moments after, Guntz reappears and offers Klonoa a spot as his partner, and they leave later that night to pursue a bounty-hunting career.

A while later during a bounty-hunting mission where Klonoa and Guntz split up from one another, Guntz ends up running into Janga, a villain with poison claws who he holds a grudge against for killing his father in the past. Both Klonoa and Guntz end up behind bars, but are able to break out of their cell due to an explosion caused by a large armadillo named Pango, who is a bomb expert. Guntz eventually splits off from Klonoa entirely in order to persue Janga, who had been seen speaking to an ally of his, the mad clown Joka, about their sinister plans. Joka mentions that he'll be heading to the Sky Temple to collect something and that they'll meet up at Volk afterwards. Klonoa eventually runs into Pango again, who explains that he wants to cure his son, Boris, from a mysterious sleeping sickness, and that the cure could be found in a book somewhere in the Sky Temple. Klonoa and Pango travel together to the Sky Temple, where Klonoa finds out that Pango has a silver Hero Medal. Klonoa and Pango find Lolo, who offers to give the two a tour around the Sky Temple, during which Klonoa gets his very own blank Hero Medal. An event causes Lolo to get separated from Klonoa and Pango, and she ends up being kidnapped by Joka, who has also stolen the book containing the cure for the sleeping sickness. Klonoa and Pango end up being defeated, but they continue to press onwards and head towards Volk, the place that Pango was able to deduce where a rocket launch will be taking place. After some time, Klonoa and Pango run into Guntz, who is still pursuing Janga, and they decide to team up. The trio are unable to stop the rocket from launching and are unable to save Lolo in time, but they manage to defeat Joka shortly afterwards.

The heroes end up making their way to the moon by rocket, and they soon learn that the madman responsible for everything that has happened so far was none other than Garlen, who is behind the monsters that appeared on Klonoa's home planet and created the sleeping sickness to gather energy from peoples' nightmares all around the world, all in order to bring back the hero Nahatomb, who was worshipped by the people of the moon in the past but became consumed by his own heroism and felt that he couldn't live without the dreams of others, transforming himself into a demon of darkness and creating the Star Medals in order to separate all into "heroes" and "hero-followers", all in an attempt to siphon off dreams gathered by heroes who held the Star Medals. After a great battle, Nahatomb retreated to the moon and fell into a deep sleep, with his followers building a town over him to seal him away and keep him from spreading nightmares to the world below. Legend says that a priestess is needed to be used as a living battery to bring back Nahatomb as well, hence why Lolo was captured.

The heroes run into Janga on their way to Garlen's base and subsequently beat him. In a last ditch move, Janga attempts to poison Guntz with his poison claws, but Klonoa ends up taking the blow instead. Furious, Guntz fires at Janga and Janga falls to his doom. Klonoa ends up in a coma and has a nightmare where he is forced to find his own answer for why he wanted to be a hero in the first place. Guntz and Pango are able to cure the poison in time, and with some outside encouragement, Klonoa is able to wake up from his coma and finds his own answer: to keep moving forward, no matter how many times [he] fails. Klonoa, Guntz and Pango confront Garlen and are able to defeat him, but Nahatomb is able to awaken regardless and absorbs Garlen. After some talk about what truly makes a hero, Klonoa, Guntz and Pango battle Nahatomb. After a while, everyone who is lost in their nightmares, including Lolo, decide to fight back against them and believe in their dreams, allowing Klonoa, Guntz and Pango to deliver the final blow, putting an end to this once and for all.

Later, Klonoa tends to a comatose Lolo, who is unable to wake up from her coma. Pango finds out that the cure for the sleeping sickness lies in a flower that can only be found in Breezegale, that being the Hikari Sakura, which Klonoa had given to Lolo just before her departure. The Hikari Sakura is unable to bloom due to the gravitational pull of their home planet, but thanks to the lower gravitational pull of the moon, Lolo is able to wake up from her coma. Upon waking up, she tells an overjoyed Klonoa that she knew he would keep his promise to the very end. With all said and done, they head back to their home planet.

A while later, Pango was said to have cured his son from the sleeping sickness, while Guntz left for parts unknown. Klonoa ends up finding out that his Hero Medal, which had turned gold, had mysteriously reverted back to being blank. He isn't too mad about this revelation, saying that "[he] can be a hero any time."

Gameplay 

Taking a unique twist on the normal gameplay of the Klonoa handheld games, Klonoa Heroes instead relies on the player moving Klonoa, Guntz, or Pango across the screen from a top-down perspective, having them defeat enemies and earn experience points in the form of Dream Shards (small, crystal-like objects) and gold, which is used for currency, along the way. Klonoa once again utilizes his familiar weapon, the Wind Ring, but this time the "wind bullet" he can fire from it can be either blue or red. Guntz's handguns and Pango's bombs work the same way. Characters can acquire different weapons throughout the game. Likewise, each enemy in the game is given a color affinity of either blue or red, and Klonoa (or the other characters) can deal more damage to them by attacking with the same color.

Restorative items can be either found in chests located sporadically throughout each level, or purchased from merchants in town. These items, when used, restore a portion of the character's hit points, as well as provide other small benefits. Characters can also "level up", which allows the player to place points of their choice in different statistics: such as attack power, defense, and agility. Players can change the number of points attributed to each stat at any time (when not in a section of a level).

Klonoa and his friends must travel through eight worlds separated into several small levels called visions. At the end of each world, the characters must take on a boss monster, a much more difficult encounter than usual, in order to advance.

Songs
Theme song:
 "Sign of Hero" by Kumiko Watanabe (渡辺 久美子), Kanako Kakino (柿埜嘉奈子)

On March 22, 2011, Namco released the full soundtrack for the game called "Klonoa Heroes: Legendary Star Medal Music Collection" which includes the full studio version as well as karaoke version of "Sign of Hero". Previously, fans could only listen to the downscaled GBA synthesized version. The song, as well as the entire soundtrack is now available on iTunes.

Reception
On release, Famitsu magazine scored the game a 31 out of 40.

References

External links 
 Official website

Role-playing video games
Action role-playing video games
Game Boy Advance games
Game Boy Advance-only games
Japan-exclusive video games
Klonoa
Namco games
2002 video games
Video games developed in Japan
Single-player video games